Pino Cabras (born 27 January 1968 in Lanusei, Sardegna) is an Italian politician. He is the leader of the Alternativa political party.

Political career 
As a member of the Five Star Movement, Cabras was elected to the Chamber of Deputies in the 2018 Italian general election. He was expelled from the party for voting against the Draghi government in February 2021.

References 

1968 births
21st-century Italian journalists
21st-century Italian politicians
Deputies of Legislature XVIII of Italy
Five Star Movement politicians
Italian eurosceptics
Living people
Politicians affected by a party expulsion process